James R. Edwards (born 1945) is an American New Testament scholar. His primary research interests include Biblical studies and the history of the early church, with secondary interests in the Reformation and history of the twentieth-century German Church struggle. After gaining degrees from Whitworth University (B.A.), Princeton Theological Seminary (M.Div.), and Fuller Theological Seminary (Ph.D.), and further study at the University of Zurich and the University of Tübingen, Tyndale House (Cambridge), and the Center of Theological Inquiry (Princeton), in 1997 he joined the faculty at Whitworth University, Spokane, Washington. He continues his work as Professor Emeritus of Theology.

The Hebrew Gospel and the Development of the Synoptic Tradition
In 2009, Edwards advanced a controversial theory that the synoptic Gospels are partly dependent on the "Hebrew Gospel", which includes the Gospel of the Hebrews, a syncretistic Jewish–Christian text believed by most scholars to have been composed in Koine Greek, the Hebrew Gospel hypothesis of Lessing and others, and traditions of a writing of Matthew's supposed to have been written by him “in the Hebrew language” (Papias) and Hebrew Gospel of Matthew, 1385, a rabbinical translation of Matthew's gospel. Edwards argues that patristic citations from "the Hebrew Gospel" correlate more distinctly and repeatedly with sections called "Special Luke" in the Gospel of Luke than with either the Gospel of Matthew or the Gospel of Mark.

Two separate reviews were published by the Society of Biblical Literature in which the reviewers were not convinced of Edwards' thesis. John S. Kloppenborg also reviewed Edwards' thesis negatively.

Edwards also rejects the modern division, by Schneemelcher and others, of the Jewish-Christian Gospels' fragments into three or more separate lost Gospels.

Works

Commentaries

Other books

--

Articles

References

Living people
1945 births
20th-century American writers
21st-century American writers
20th-century American male writers
21st-century American male writers
20th-century Christian biblical scholars
21st-century Christian biblical scholars
American biblical scholars
New Testament scholars
Whitworth University alumni
Princeton Theological Seminary alumni
Place of birth missing (living people)
Fuller Theological Seminary alumni
Whitworth University faculty
Presbyterian Church (USA) teaching elders
University of Zurich alumni
University of Tübingen alumni